Heinz Wolfram (17 January 1935 – 10 June 2022) was a German speed skater. He competed in two events at the 1960 Winter Olympics.

References

External links
 

1935 births
2022 deaths
German male speed skaters
Olympic speed skaters of the United Team of Germany
Speed skaters at the 1960 Winter Olympics
People from the Province of Brandenburg
People from Żagań County
20th-century German people